Pat Sajak (born Patrick Leonard ; born October 26, 1946) is an American television personality and game show host. He is best known as the host of the American television game show Wheel of Fortune, a position he has held since 1981. For his work on Wheel, Sajak has received 19 nominations for the Daytime Emmy Award for Outstanding Game Show Host, winning three times.

Early life
Born in Chicago, Illinois, on October 26, 1946, Sajak graduated from Farragut High School in 1964, then went to Columbia College Chicago while working as a desk clerk at the Palmer House hotel.

He served in the U.S. Army as a disc jockey during the Vietnam War for American Forces Vietnam Network. Sajak hosted the same Dawn Buster radio show that Adrian Cronauer had, and for 14 months followed Cronauer's tradition of signing on with "Good Morning Vietnam!"

Career

Sajak won a contest on WLS radio's Dick Biondi Show to be a guest teen deejay. While at Columbia College Chicago, his broadcasting instructor Al Parker told him that a local radio station (WEDC) was looking for a newsman. Sajak applied for the job and was hired to work from midnight to 6:00 am. In 1968, he joined the U.S. Army and was sent to Vietnam, where he served as a disc jockey on Armed Forces Radio. On the Military Channel's program, An Officer and a Movie, Sajak admitted to botching President Richard Nixon's 1969 Christmas broadcast to the troops; he accidentally cut the feed off prematurely. Upon realizing the error, Sajak decided it would be best not to resume the feed. In the early 1970s, he DJed for a year for a Murray, Kentucky radio station. Also in the early 1970s, Sajak began DJing at 50,000-watt WSM in Nashville; at the time, WSM was playing pop music during the day, and he was the 2:30–5:00 pm afternoon personality. The radio station's television sister, WSM-TV (now WSMV), brought Sajak on screen, first as a voiceover artist making station identifications and anchoring the five-minute newscasts during NBC's Today Show, then as a weekend and substitute weatherman, where he became acquainted with anchor Dan Miller. In 1977, KNBC-TV in Los Angeles was looking for a weather reporter and spotted Sajak working in Nashville. He accepted KNBC's request for him to be a full-time weather reporter for the station.

In 1981, Merv Griffin asked Sajak if he would be interested in taking over the duties as host on Wheel of Fortune from Chuck Woolery. However, Fred Silverman, the president and CEO of NBC, rejected his hiring, claiming Sajak was too local, and Griffin responded by imposing a moratorium on new tapings until Sajak was hired. The issue became moot when Silverman was dismissed due to repeated programming failures and replaced by Brandon Tartikoff. Sajak, who had already hosted two game show pilots in 1980, Press Your Luck for Ralph Edwards (no relation to the 1983 CBS game show of the same name) and Puzzlers for Mark Goodson, accepted the position. Sajak hosted both the daytime (NBC) and syndicated evening versions of Wheel from 1983 to 1989 and continues to host the latter version. With Sajak returning for his 36th season in 2018–19, he became the longest-running host of any game show, surpassing Bob Barker, who hosted The Price Is Right from 1972 to 2007. Sajak was officially honored as such by the Guinness World Records with the episode taped on March 28, 2019, and aired May 8, 2019 (two days before the primetime version's 7,000th episode).

Sajak had a small role as a Buffalo, New York newscaster in the 1982 comedy film Airplane II: The Sequel. When his late-night talk show on CBS premiered in January 1989, he left the daytime version of Wheel and was replaced by former San Diego Chargers place-kicker Rolf Benirschke (who was later replaced by Bob Goen when the daytime show moved to CBS in July of that year). Sajak appeared on Super Password several times from 1984 to 1989, as well as Password Plus in 1981, shortly before taking on hosting duties on Wheel. Other game shows on which he appeared as a celebrity guest were Dream House, Just Men!, and Match Game-Hollywood Squares Hour.

Sajak hosted a short-lived late-night talk show on CBS from January 9, 1989, to April 13, 1990. Dan Miller, Sajak's old friend and former anchor at WSM-TV in Nashville, joined him as his sidekick. Sajak later became a frequent guest host for CNN's Larry King Live when King was unable to do the show. He became a regular substitute host for Regis Philbin on the syndicated Live with Regis and Kelly. Sajak also hosted Pat Sajak Weekend on Fox News in 2003. From at least 2002, Sajak hosted The Pat Sajak Baseball Hour, a syndicated weekly radio sports talk show that ended in 2006 due to scheduling conflicts.

Sajak is an external director of conservative publishing house Eagle Publishing. He has served on the board of directors for the Claremont Institute.

In 1983, Sajak portrayed Kevin Hathaway in the NBC daytime soap opera Days of Our Lives.

In 1993, Sajak appeared as himself on the children's cartoon show Rugrats.

In 1997, Sajak pulled an April Fool's Day prank on fans when Vanna White and he were contestants on an episode of Wheel hosted by Alex Trebek. The winnings of both Sajak and White were donated to charity (in this case, the American Cancer Society and the Boy Scouts of America). In return, Sajak hosted a regular episode of Jeopardy! in place of Trebek. Sajak also appeared at the beginning of a 2010 April Fool's episode, along with Jeff Probst and Neil Patrick Harris.

In 2001, Sajak appeared as himself in the episode "Inner Tube" on the sitcom The King of Queens.

Sajak began writing for the National Review Online in 2010. In his first post, he questioned whether public employees should be allowed to vote on issues that would benefit them directly. He also has contributed to the center-right sociopolitical / social networking website Ricochet.com.

Sajak is the author of several puzzle games, the first and best-known of them being "Lucky Letters", which debuted in 2007. The games, which Sajak developed with puzzle developer David L. Hoyt, are syndicated through Universal Uclick.

Sajak has appeared on episodes of ESPN Radio's The Dan Le Batard Show with Stugotz, as well as Le Batard's other show, Highly Questionable.

Since 2020, Sajak has been credited as a Consulting Producer (since the start of Season 39) of Wheel of Fortune.

Since 2021, Sajak and White have hosted Prime Time Celebrity Wheel of Fortune on ABC.

In September 2021, it was announced that both Sajak and White had signed on to continue as hosts of Wheel of Fortune through the 2023–24 season. In 2021, Sajak voiced a singing bust in a Muppets Haunted Mansion television special.

In popular culture

Sajak was parodied in a 1980s Sesame Street sketch, with a Muppet named Pat Playjacks hosting "Squeal of Fortune". The goal was for the contestants (Prairie Dawn and The Count) to guess how many times a pig in the center of the wheel would squeal before the wheel stopped.

During the 1980s, comedian Martin Short frequently portrayed a fictional character he called Ed Grimley, a hyperactive manchild who is obsessed with banal popular culture – Sajak in particular – on the sketch comedy television shows SCTV and Saturday Night Live.

In 1986, Sajak and his Wheel of Fortune co-star Vanna White portrayed themselves on an episode of the NBC sitcom 227.

In the fourth-season episode of The A-Team called "Wheel of Fortune", Sajak makes a cameo along with co-star Vanna White. In the episode, Murdock wins big at Wheel of Fortune due to Face's system of guessing the letters correctly.

In 1992, Sajak was a special guest star in the TV show The Commish. The episode first aired on November 7, 1992, and was called "The Two Faces of Ed". He played psychologist Brian Brandon.

In the fourth episode of season three of Comedy Central's Brickleberry, "That Brother's My Father", Sajak gets kidnapped and becomes a hostage to the wheel of fortune.

Personal life
Sajak is married to Lesly Brown-Sajak, a photographer, with whom he has a son, Patrick Michael James Sajak (born September 22, 1990), and a daughter, Maggie Marie Sajak (born January 5, 1995). The couple lives in Severna Park, Maryland, with a second home in Los Angeles, California.

In 2005, Sajak became an investor in the Golden Baseball League, an independent professional baseball league with teams in California, Arizona, Nevada, Utah, Alberta, British Columbia, and Baja California. During a guest appearance in the broadcast booth at a March 2012 Baltimore Orioles – Boston Red Sox spring-training game, Sajak acknowledged that he had called some baseball games in the past.

Sajak is featured in a brief film shown at the visitor's center at Mount Vernon, the residence of George Washington, where he explains to tourists the attractions of the site. Sajak, since 1998, owns Maryland-based AM radio station WNAV in Annapolis.

Sajak is a Republican, and has written a number of columns for the conservative magazine Human Events. He is also a regular poster and podcast participant on the conservative blog Ricochet.com. Sajak rejects the scientific consensus on climate change. He is also a financial supporter of the Young America's Foundation, which sponsors conservative speakers on college campuses.

In 2019, Sajak began serving as the Hillsdale College board of trustees chair. He previously served as vice-chair for 15 years.

Sajak is an avid fan of the Washington Capitals NHL team. He is a longtime season-ticket holder and made an on-ice appearance before game three of the 2018 Stanley Cup Finals.

Health
Sajak underwent emergency intestinal surgery to remove a blockage on November 8, 2019. While Sajak recovered, co-host Vanna White hosted in his place. The first taping day in which he was incapacitated was a Disney-themed Christmas episode week. Disney characters took over White's role at the puzzle board for that week. Sajak's daughter Maggie also helped White for a week.

Sajak returned to work on December 5, 2019.

References

External links

1946 births
Living people
21st-century American essayists
American bloggers
American game show hosts
American male bloggers
American members of the Churches of Christ
American people of Polish descent
American radio DJs
American television talk show hosts
California Republicans
Columbia College Chicago alumni
Conservatism in the United States
Daytime Emmy Award for Outstanding Game Show Host winners
Daytime Emmy Award winners
Farragut Career Academy alumni
Illinois Republicans
Late night television talk show hosts
Maryland Republicans
People from Severna Park, Maryland
Philanthropists from Illinois
Television personalities from Chicago
United States Army personnel of the Vietnam War
United States Army soldiers
Wheel of Fortune (franchise)